Troitsky is a rural locality (a selo) and the administrative centre of Troitsky Selsoviet, Blagovarsky District, Bashkortostan, Russia. The population was 408 as of 2010. There are 3 streets.

Geography 
Troitsky is located 28 km northwest of Yazykovo (the district's administrative centre) by road. Novokonstantinovka is the nearest rural locality.

References 

Rural localities in Blagovarsky District